Strongylognathus arnoldii is a species of ant in the subfamily Myrmicinae. It is endemic to Russia.

References

Strongylognathus
Insects of Russia
Endemic fauna of Russia
Insects described in 1985
Taxonomy articles created by Polbot